Franz Johann von Vogt von Altensumerau und Prasberg (6 November 1611 – 7 March 1689) was a Roman Catholic prelate who served as Auxiliary Bishop of Konstanz (1641–1645) and then as Bishop of Konstanz (1645–1689).

Biography
Franz Johann von Vogt von Altensumerau und Prasberg was born in Syberschweiler, Germany on 6 November 1611 and ordained a priest on 3 March 1635. On 16 December 1641, he was appointed during the papacy of Pope Urban VIII as Auxiliary Bishop of Konstanz and Titular Bishop of Megara. On 22 December 1641, he was consecrated bishop by Ciriaco Rocci, Cardinal-Priest of San Salvatore in Lauro, with Alfonso Gonzaga, Titular Archbishop of Rhodus, and Alphonse Sacrati, Bishop Emeritus of Comacchio serving as co-consecrators. On 16 February 1645, he was selected as Bishop of Konstanz and confirmed by Pope Innocent X on 28 May 1645. He served as Bishop of Konstanz until his death on 7 March 1689.

While bishop, he was the principal consecrator of Gabriel Haug, Auxiliary Bishop of Strasbourg (1646).

References 

17th-century German Roman Catholic bishops
Bishops appointed by Pope Urban VIII
Bishops appointed by Pope Innocent X
1611 births
1689 deaths